Dead Hollywood Stars is a cross-genre electronic music project of the Canadian musician John Sellekaers.  Because of its use of guitars and nostalgic atmospheres journalists have compared the project's sound to the work of Italian composer Ennio Morricone.

History
The first Dead 02/12/2001Stars album, Gone West, was based on Country & Western themes, and was released in 2000 through the Mad Monkey label.

In 2002 Dead Hollywood Stars released an album in CD format, titled Junction. A BBC reviewer descrived the sound as cinematic and luxurious. 

The 2005 album, Smoke and Mirrors, had a more pop music style and included contributions from  Quentin de Hemptinne on guitars and drummer Alex Grousset.

Past members
Past members of Dead Hollywood Stars have included: Cedrik Fermont and Hervé Thomas.

Discography
Gone West, 2000, CD
Wagon of Miracles, 2000, 12"
Junctions, 2002, CD
Junctions/Gone West, 2002, 2xCD
Smoke and Mirrors, 2005, CDEP

References

External links
Dead Hollywood Stars Official site

Musical groups established in 2000
Musical groups from Montreal
Canadian electronic music groups
Belgian electronic music groups